A physician, medical practitioner, medical doctor, or simply doctor, is a health professional who practices medicine, which is concerned with promoting, maintaining or restoring health through the study, diagnosis, prognosis and treatment of disease, injury, and other physical and mental impairments.

According to 2023 reports the numbar of physicians per capita(10,000) in all countries are as follows:-

List

References

 

Physicians
Global health
Physicians
^
Physicians